Cosmophasis thalassina is a species of jumping spider found from Malaysia to Australia. It was probably dispersed to the gardens and the parks of Queensland by man.

Description
The carapace is covered with greenish-bronze and squamose copper hairs, with some black transverse bands. The opisthosoma is mostly dark, with a white collar at the front that continues beyond halfway along each side. Some transverse white marks can be seen in the frontal part. The dark legs bear white and bronze squamose hairs.

The metallic color has been found to be a combination of a first-order diffraction grating and an underlying broadband multilayer reflector. The grating directs mostly the blue spectral component away from the incoming direction, which, together with the white reflection, results in a yellow reflection from most angles. It feeds on ants.

Footnotes

References
  (1999): Salticidae (Arachnida: Araneae) of Islands off Australia. Journal of Arachnology 27: 229-235. PDF
  (2000): An Introduction to the Spiders of South East Asia. Malaysian Nature Society, Kuala Lumpur.
  (2003): Diffractive optics in spiders. J. Opt. A: Pure Appl. Opt. 5: 111-116. 
  (2007): The world spider catalog, version 8.0. American Museum of Natural History.

External links
 Salticidae.org: Diagnostic drawings

Salticidae
Spiders described in 1846
Arthropods of Malaysia
Spiders of Australia
Spiders of Asia